Nothocascellius is a genus of beetles in the family Carabidae, containing the following species:

 Nothocascellius aeneoniger (Waterhouse, 1841)
 Nothocascellius hyadesii (Fairmaire, 1885)

References

Broscini
Carabidae genera